Meganophthalmus is a genus of beetles in the family Carabidae, containing the following species:

 Meganophthalmus irinae Belousov & Zamotajlov, 1999
 Meganophthalmus kravetzi Komarov, 1993
 Meganophthalmus kutaissianus (Zaitzev, 1941)
 Meganophthalmus medvedevi Belousov & Koval, 2009
 Meganophthalmus mirabilis Kurnakov, 1959

References

Trechinae